Nyasha Chari (born 10 October 1980) is a Zimbabwean cricketer. He played eleven first-class matches between 2000 and 2008.

See also
 CFX Academy cricket team

References

External links
 

1980 births
Living people
Zimbabwean cricketers
CFX Academy cricketers
Mashonaland cricketers
Midlands cricketers
Northerns (Zimbabwe) cricketers
Sportspeople from Harare